Lü Fuyuan (October 1945 – 18 May 2004) was the first minister of the Ministry of Commerce of the People's Republic of China.

Biography
After graduating from Jilin University with a degree in Physics, Lü worked for several years in the First Automobile Works in Changchun, and then studied at the Université de Montréal in Canada during 1981 and 1983; but later, he refused the offer to stay in Canada.

When Lü went backed to China, the Chinese Embassy to Canada then suggested the First Automobile Works to invite Lü joined the Communist Party of China in 1983. Soon, Lü was promoted to the Deputy Executive Officer of First Automobile Works and the Chief Economist Officer, in charging operations and trades. He was also awarded by the Central Military Commission because of his contribution to the 35th National Day Parade of People's Republic of China in 1984.

Six years later, Lü joined the Ministry of Machine Industry of China, as the Department Head of automobile Industry; and then was promoted to the Deputy Minister of Machine Industry. During the eight years in office, he had made tremendous contribution to China's Automobile Industry, and personally involved in a number of projects. He also invited Wan Gang, a Chinese expert on automobiles who at that time was working with German Audi Corporation, to return to China.

Since 1998, Lü was assigned to be the Deputy Minister in Ministry of Education, and then Foreign Trade and Economic Co-operation.

In March 2003, the former Ministry of Foreign Trade and Economic Co-operation (MOFTEC) went through a reorganization and was renamed as Ministry of Commerce. Lü was promoted to be the first Minister of Commerce. However, after less than one year in the office, Lü resigned on 29 February 2004 due to liver cancer and died three months later.

External links
Former Chinese commerce minister dies

1945 births
2004 deaths
People from Suihua
People's Republic of China politicians from Heilongjiang
Jilin University alumni
Chinese Communist Party politicians from Heilongjiang
Ministers of Commerce of the People's Republic of China
Burials at Babaoshan Revolutionary Cemetery